Survival of the Friendliest: Understanding Our Origins and Rediscovering Our Common Humanity is a book by anthropologist Brian Hare and writer Vanessa Woods, first published in 2020, based on Hare's research hypothesis of human self-domestication. The main thesis of the book is that late in human evolution Homo sapiens underwent a process of extreme selection for friendliness that led to the self-domestication syndrome, as seen in other animals. The self-domestication syndrome led to a series of cognitive changes that allowed modern humans to out compete other species of humans in the Pleistocene, including Neanderthals, and become the most successful mammal on the planet. Hare and Woods argue that self-domestication is an ongoing process that continues today.

Summary 
There are many theories on why modern humans became so successful while other human species went extinct, which generally revolve around humans becoming more intelligent which led to improvements in weapons and technology. Hare and Woods argue that instead, humans underwent extreme selection for prosociality, and that cognitive changes occurred by accident.

Domestication syndrome 
Domestication is a process of human induced artificial selection that causes marked changes in an animal compared to their wild relatives. Collectively called the domestication syndrome, these changes include physiology (increases in serotonin, oxytocin), morphology (skull shape and size, tooth size, floppy ears, curly tails, star mutations), behavior (reproductive cycle, juvenile behavior), and social cognition (increase in cooperative communicative abilities). Different domesticated animals have different combinations of these changes. Until recently, it was poorly understood why different species of domesticated animals developed which traits. However, one trait that all domesticated animals share is a reduction in aggression compared to their wild relatives.

Pioneering experiments where Siberian foxes were experimentally domesticated demonstrated that domestication is directly caused by intense selection against aggression. Over 50 generations, breeding only the friendliest, non-aggressive foxes, whose fear towards humans was replaced by attraction, led to a cascade of the physiological, morphological, behavioral, and cognitive changes apparent in other domesticated animals.

Self-domestication 
The process of self-domestication is similar, but instead of humans actively selecting against aggression, natural selection favors the process instead. As an example, in our closest living relatives, bonobos, self domestication can occur entirely without human intervention. Compared to our other closest living relatives, chimpanzees, bonobos are much less aggressive, and have never been observed to kill their group members or attack neighboring groups. Recent work shows that the friendliest bonobo male is more reproductively successful than the most despotic chimpanzee. Thus natural selection could favor reduced aggression in bonobos, which would have led to the domestication syndrome. Indeed, compared to chimpanzees, bonobos have changes to their morphology, (reduced cranial size, canine dimorphism, and depigmentation of the lips and tail tufts), physiology (changes to serotonin receptors and testosterone response), behavior (more juvenilized socio sexual behavior and play) and social cognition (increase in cooperative abilities).

Human self-domestication 
If self domestication could occur in bonobos, then it may also be possible in our own species. Hare and Woods propose that natural selection favored increased in-group prosociality over aggression in late human evolution. As a by-product of this selection, humans are predicted to show traits of the domestication syndrome observed in other domestic animals, including early-emerging cooperative communicative abilities.

Drawing on comparative, developmental, fossil, and neurobiological evidence, Hare and Woods propose that late human evolution was dominated by selection for intragroup prosociality over aggression. As a result, modern humans possess traits consistent with the syndrome associated with domestication in other animals. Increases in cognition, particularly related to cooperative communicative abilities, occurred by accident.

Reception 
Survival of the Friendliest was well covered in the press, but there were popular and academic critiques.

Carel Van Shaik wrote: 'A lack of empirical studies on evolutionary rates and variation thwarts meaningful comparison with domestication.'

Legal scholar Cass Sunstein wrote: 'Hare and Woods make it plausible to think that an underlying propensity of Homo Sapiens—to divide the world into insiders and outsiders—is causing a great deal of contemporary turmoil. But the underlying mechanisms are numerous, and evolutionary explanations are hardly sufficient. In the United States, for example, party antagonisms are much greater now than they were forty years ago; Homo Sapiens has not changed much in that time', although later in the review Sunstein  conceded: 'Homo Sapiens triumphed because of our capacity to cooperate with one another. In a challenging time, that is an inspiring message—and it suggests, in the strongest possible terms, that this is a capacity to cultivate.'

Conservative commenters such as Pat Gray have criticized 'their theory they are altering now to fit their sensibilities, and their cry closets'.

References 

2020 non-fiction books
Human evolution books
Random House books